Roberto de Jesús is a male beach volleyball player from Dominican Republic, who participated  the 2006 NORCECA Men’s Beach Volleyball Continental Championship with Ezequiel Castillo.

He also competed at the 2008 NORCECA Beach Volleyball Circuit with Charlin Vargas.

At the Dominican Beach Tour 2008, he won a gold medal, playing with Yhonastan Fabian.

He also earned a third place with Sánchez Ramírez at the Dominican Republic Volleyball League playing indoor volleyball.

Clubs
  Sánchez Ramírez (2008)

References

 
 Federación Dominicana de Voleibol (FEDOVOLI)

Year of birth missing (living people)
Living people
Dominican Republic men's volleyball players
Dominican Republic beach volleyball players
Men's beach volleyball players